Willen Mota Inácio (born 10 January 1992), simply known as Willen, is a Brazilian professional footballer who plays as a striker for Thai side True Bangkok United.

External links

1992 births
Living people
Footballers from Rio de Janeiro (city)
Brazilian footballers
Association football forwards
Campeonato Brasileiro Série B players
CR Vasco da Gama players
Bangu Atlético Clube players
América Futebol Clube (RN) players
Avaí FC players
Liga Portugal 2 players
Portimonense S.C. players
Assyriska FF players
Songkhla United F.C. players
PT Prachuap F.C. players
Bangkok United F.C. players
Sisaket F.C. players
Thai League 1 players
Thai League 2 players
Al Batin FC players
Hajer FC players
Saudi First Division League players
Saudi Professional League players
Brazilian expatriate footballers
Brazilian expatriate sportspeople in Portugal
Expatriate footballers in Portugal
Brazilian expatriate sportspeople in Sweden
Expatriate footballers in Sweden
Brazilian expatriate sportspeople in Thailand
Expatriate footballers in Thailand
Brazilian expatriate sportspeople in Saudi Arabia
Expatriate footballers in Saudi Arabia